Günther Wirth (9 January 1933 – 13 November 2020) was a German footballer who made 254 East German top-flight appearances (64 goals), and played 28 matches with 11 goals for the East Germany national team. He died on 13 November 2020 after a long illness.

External links

References 

1933 births
2020 deaths
Footballers from Dresden
German footballers
East German footballers
East Germany international footballers
Association football forwards
1. FC Union Berlin players
1. FC Frankfurt players
DDR-Oberliga players